The Port Elmsley Drive-In theatre is a drive-in theatre located near Port Elmsley, between Perth and Smiths Falls, Ontario, Canada.

History 
Construction finished in 1953,  after having trucked in tens of thousands of tonnes of gravel, to level the ground. Financial troubles arose in 2018, and the cinema was planning on closing, however, the COVID-19 pandemic boosted its sales and allowed it to stay open.

References

External links 
 http://www.portelmsleydrivein.com/

Drive-in theaters
Cinemas and movie theatres in Ontario
Buildings and structures in Lanark County